Big Sur Village is an unincorporated community in the Big Sur region, in Monterey County, California, United States. The village contains the largest collection of shops and visitor services along the entire  segment of California State Route 1 between Malpaso Creek near Carmel Highlands in the north and San Carpóforo Creek near San Simeon in the south. The population of the entire coastal region is about 1,463. The collection of small roadside businesses and homes is often confused with the larger region, also known as Big Sur. On March 6, 1915, United States Post Office granted the English-speaking residents' request to change the name of their post office from Arbolado to Big Sur. Caltrans also refers to the village as Big Sur.

Services

The privately owned  Big Sur Campground and Cabins, Riverside Campground, Fernwood Resort, and Ripplewood Resort are nearby. The Village is located in a Redwood forest bordered to the south by Pfeiffer Big Sur State Park, Los Padres National Forest on the east and west, and to the north by Andrew Molera State Park. The Captain Cooper Elementary School is nearby. The Big Sur River passes through the Village. Pfeiffer Beach is to the west at the end of Sycamore Canyon.

Transportation 

Until about 1924, a rough dirt road that was often impassible in winter connected residents with Carmel and Monterey to the north. The road extended south  to Posts and Castro Canyon, ending near the present-day location of Deetjen's Big Sur Inn. The 30-mile (48 km) trip from Carmel could take three days by wagon or stagecoach.  The state began constructing a paved two-lane road in 1924. When completed on June 17, 1937, it was initially named the Roosevelt Highway. The road may be closed by Caltrans due to severe inclement weather. The area around the village is the only location along the coast where the highway runs inland.

Public transportation is available to and from Monterey on Monterey–Salinas Transit. The summer schedule operates from Memorial Day to Labor Day three times a day, while the winter schedule only offers bus service on weekends. Service can be interrupted by high winds and severe weather. There is a single shuttle van that operates during the summer on Thursday through Sunday from the Big Sur Station to Pfeiffer Beach.

Etymology 

The name "Big Sur" has its origins in the area's early Spanish history. While the Portolá expedition was exploring Alta California, they arrived at San Carpóforo Canyon near present-day San Simeon on September 13, 1769. Unable to penetrate the difficult terrain along the coast, they detoured inland through the San Antonio and Salinas Valleys before arriving at Monterey Bay, where they founded Monterey and named it the provincial capital.

The Spanish referred to the vast and relatively unexplored coastal region to the south of Monterey as el país grande del sur, meaning "the big country of the south". This was often shortened to el sur grande (the big south). The two major rivers draining this portion of the coast were named El Rio Grande del Sur and El Rio Chiquito del Sur.

The first recorded use of the name "el Sud" (meaning "the South") was on a map of the Rancho El Sur land grant given by Governor José Figueroa to Juan Bautista Alvarado on July 30, 1834.

Post office 

Big Sur’s first post office, named "Posts", was in the home of W.B. Post. Confusion ensued when mail intended for the Presidio was sent to Big Sur, and mail for the military post was sent to the local residents.

The homesteaders changed the name of their post office to Arbolado (Spanish for woodland) but that was confused by the post office for Alvarado, a street in Monterey. The post office operated at Posts from 1889 to 1910. The residents then petitioned the United States Post Office in Washington, D.C., to change the post office name to Big Sur, and the rubber stamp using that name was returned on March 6, 1915, cementing the name in place. The ZIP Code is 93920. The community is inside area code 831.

History 

The region was historically occupied by the Esselen and Salinan people prior to the arrival of European immigrants. The Esselen lived in the area between Point Sur south to Big Creek. Archaeological evidence shows that the Esselen lived in Big Sur as early as 3500 BC, leading a nomadic, hunter-gatherer existence. Beginning in about 1771, the Native Americans were forcibly relocated and conscripted as laborers at the Carmel Mission, where their way of life were lost to them, and their population was decimated by disease, starvation, overwork, and torture.

The first known European settler in Big Sur was George Davis, who in 1853 claimed a tract of land along the Big Sur River. He built a cabin near the present day site of the beginning of the Mount Manuel Trail. In 1868, Native Americans Manual and Florence Innocenti bought Davis' cabin and land for $50. In the winter of 1869, Michael and Barbara Laquet Pfeiffer were on their way to the south coast of Big Sur when they were forced to stop for the season in the Sycamore Canyon area near present-day Big Sur Village. They liked the area so much they decided against moving south again the following spring. They brought four children with them: Charles, John, Mary Ellen, and Julia. They later had four more:  William, Frank, Flora, and Adelaide. After the Homestead Act of 1862 was passed by Congress, he filed for patents on his land in 1883 and 1889.  The family supported themselves by ranching and beekeeping. The Pfeiffer home became well known among travelers along the coast, and when the number of guests grew, in 1908 the Pfeiffer Ranch Resort became the first formal lodging along the coast when they began charging guests.  The location is now the site of the Big Sur Lodge.

The Pfeiffer's son John Martin Pfeiffer and his wife Zulema Florence Swetnam built a cabin near the north bank of the Big Sur River in 1884. Another of the oldest establishments along the coast is the Big Sur River Inn and Restaurant founded in 1932.

In August 1972, the Molera Fire burned the hills above Big Sur. Slopes angle from 25 to 90 degrees. During the following winter, four tributaries of the Big Sur River were struck with so much rain that on November 18, 1972, a mudflow deposited several feet of mud around the Post Office and a few other nearby buildings.

Government
At the county level, Big Sur Village is represented on the Monterey County Board of Supervisors by Mary Adams. In the United States House of Representatives, the Village is in

References

Big Sur
Unincorporated communities in California
Unincorporated communities in Monterey County, California
Populated coastal places in California